Oregon Venture Fund makes venture investments in the Portland, Oregon area and throughout Oregon and SW Washington. The fund consists of 180 institutional and  angel investors, of whom 85% have run or founded a business. The fund evaluates up to 300 business plans per year, selecting five to seven to invest in annually. In 2018, the fund changed its name from Oregon Angel Fund to Oregon Venture Fund and launched a new $30M fund. Since its inception, Oregon Venture Fund has generated an average annual rate of return of 34% and a return on investment exceeding $3.50 for each dollar invested.

Investment strategy
About 70 percent of the fund's investments are in technology. 20 percent are medical devices, health care IT, and related fields. And 10 percent are in other areas such as transportation, advanced materials, and consumer. 31% of portfolio companies were founded by, or are headed by, a woman and 23% by a person of color. Some 70 companies in Oregon Venture Fund's portfolio include Absci, Jama, Elemental Technologies, Brandlive, Salt & Straw, and Wildfang.

The Oregon Venture Fund also receives investment from The Oregon Community Foundation, Meyer Memorial Trust, the State of Oregon, and regional colleges and universities, such as Willamette University, Portland State University, and Lewis & Clark College.

Investments and exits 
Oregon Venture Fund notable investments and exits include:

 Absci (Nasdaq IPO)
Bigleaf Networks
Brandlive
Bright.MD
Bumped
ClearAccess (acquired by Cisco Systems)
Cloud Campaign
CrowdCompass (acquired by Cvent)
Customer.io
Elemental Technologies (acquired by Amazon Web Services for $500 million)
 Gear Up
Giftango (acquired by InComm)
GlobeSherpa (acquired by Daimler AG)
Hubb (acquired by Intrado)
Inpria (acquired by JSR Corp. for $514 million)
IOTAS
Jama Software (Insight Partners acquired 80% of Jama for $200M)
Kivo
 Little Bird (acquired by Sprinklr)
Lumen Learning
Meridian (acquired by Aruba for $26 million)
Opal
Pacific Light Technologies (acquired by Osram)
Poached Jobs
Rigado
RISE Brewing
Rumpl
Salt & Straw
Second Porch (acquired by HomeAway)
Sila
SmartRG (acquired by AdTran)
 Streem (acquired by Frontdoor)
The Clymb (acquired by LeftLane Sports)
The Wild (acquired by Autodesk)
TrovaTrip
Wayfinder
Wildfang

Management
Co-founded by Robert Ward and Eric Rosenfeld, the fund is now managed by Eric Rosenfeld, Alline Akintore, Deepthi Madhava, Melissa Freeman, Jon Maroney, Matt Compton, Lynn Fletcher, and Mary Geyer.

References

External links
 Oregon Venture Fund website

Financial services companies established in 2007
Venture capital firms of the United States
Companies based in Portland, Oregon
Angel investors
2007 establishments in Oregon